Josh Adams (born 1987) is an American comic book and commercial artist best known for his work on House of Mystery for DC Comics, as well as design work for shows on the Syfy Channel. Josh Adams is also the youngest of comic book veteran Neal Adams's three sons. Adams' two older brothers, Jason and Joel, are also artists who work in commercial sculpture and comic book illustration, respectively.

Career
Adams graduated from the School of Visual Arts with a BFA in cartooning in 2009.

Adams performed "full pencil assists" DC/Vertigo's House of Mystery #13. In addition, he worked for his father's production studio Continuity Studios on Marvel Comics' Astonishing X-Men: Motion Comic. Adams penciled a cover pinup of Batman in 2009, and included in issue No. 1 of the 2010 miniseries Batman: Odyssey, written and illustrated by his father.

His production art credits for the Syfy Channel, include Battlestar Galactica, Stargate SG-1, Eureka, and Ghost Hunters. Adams is currently working on the comic book mini-series SPIT, as well as the creator owned project STRAIN.

In late 2011, Josh Adams penciled and inked Doctor Who, for IDW Publishing.

He also writes as a pundit for Rich Johnston's website, Bleeding Cool.

Personal life
Adams is married to Saori Tsujimoto. He proposed to her in August 2013, presenting to her a ring that he had designed himself, embedded with the face of Jake the Dog from the animated TV series Adventure Time. They planned to wed at that year's New York Comic Con.

References

External links

 

1987 births
American comics artists
American illustrators
Living people
People from Manhattan
School of Visual Arts alumni